The Summer of Frozen Fountains is a 2015 Georgian drama film directed by Vano Burduli.

Cast
 Ia Sukhitashvili - Lika
 Nutsa Kukhianidze - Annie
 Salome Demuria - Marie
 Anamaria Burduli - Girl at the gift shop
 Dato Darchia - Zura
 Sandro Gabilaia - Gio
 Anri Jokharidze - Sandro
 Tornike Kasrashvili - Mikho
 Darejan Khachidze - Mikho's mother
 Dati Khrikadze - Nick
 Shota Kristesashvili  -Annie's father
 Nato Murvanidze - Diana
 Giorgi Nakashidze - Merab
 Eka Nijaradze - Sally's mother
 Andrius Paulavicius - Brian
 Lika Sturua - Sally
 Levan Yosebidze - Zaza

References

External links
 Film's facebook page
 

2015 films
2015 drama films
2010s Georgian-language films
Drama films from Georgia (country)